Marc Robert Waldie (born August 24, 1955 in Wichita, Kansas) is a former volleyball player from the United States. He was a member of the American Men's National Team that won the gold medal at the 1984 Summer Olympics.

See also
 USA Volleyball

References

 

1955 births
Living people
Volleyball players at the 1984 Summer Olympics
Olympic gold medalists for the United States in volleyball
American men's volleyball players
Sportspeople from Wichita, Kansas
Medalists at the 1984 Summer Olympics
Ohio State Buckeyes men's volleyball players